The Samsung Galaxy Tab A 8.0 is an Android-based tablet computer produced and marketed by Samsung Electronics. It belongs to the mid-range "A" line, which also includes a 9.7 inch model. It was announced in March 2015, and subsequently released on 1 May 2015. It is available in Wi-Fi–only and Wi-Fi/4G versions.

History 
The Galaxy Tab A 8.0 was announced together with the bigger Galaxy Tab A 9.7 in March 2015.

Galaxy Tab A 8.0 (2015)
The Galaxy Tab A 8.0 (SM-T350, SM-P350, SM-T355, and SM-P355) was released with Android 5.0 Lollipop. Samsung has customized the interface with its TouchWiz software. As well as the standard suite of Google apps, it has Samsung apps such a S Planner Smart Stay, Multi-Window, Group Play, All Share Play, Samsung Magazine, Professional pack, Multi-user mode, SideSync 3.0.

The Galaxy Tab A 8.0 is available in WiFi-only and 4G/LTE & WiFi variants. Storage ranges from 16 GB to 32 GB depending on the model, with a microSDXC card slot for expansion up to 128 GB. It has an 8.0-inch TFT LCD screen with a resolution of 1024x768 pixels and a pixel density of 160 ppi. It also features a 2 MP front camera without flash and a rear-facing 5.0 MP AF camera without flash.

Galaxy Tab A 8.0 (2017) 
In October 2017, the 2017 version of the Galaxy Tab A 8.0 (SM-T380, SM-T385) was announced, with Android 7.1 Nougat (upgradeable to Android 8.1.0 Oreo and Android 9 Pie) and the Qualcomm Snapdragon 425 chipset, and made available on 1 November 2017.

Galaxy Tab A 8.0 (2018) 
In August 2018, the 2018 version of the Galaxy Tab A 8.0 (SM-T387) was announced, with Android 8.1 Oreo (upgradeable to Android 9 Pie and Android 10) and the Qualcomm Snapdragon 425 chipset, and made available on 7 September 2018.  The Qualcomm Snapdragon 425 chipset carries over from the 2017 model.

Galaxy Tab A 8.0 (2019) 
The 2019 version of the Galaxy Tab A with S-Pen (SM-P200, only WiFi; and, SM-P205, WiFi and 4G/LTE) was announced in March of 2019, and released a month later in April, after 4 years of the original Tab A with S Pen from 2015. It features Android 9 Pie (upgradeable to Android 10), Samsung Exynos 7904 processor, and the same S Pen from the Samsung Galaxy Note 8. 2 months later in July, the 2019 version of the Galaxy Tab A 8.0 (SM-T290, SM-T295, SM-T297) was announced, with Android 9 Pie (upgradeable to Android 10 and Android 11) and the Qualcomm Snapdragon 429 chipset, and made available on 5 July 2019.

Galaxy Tab A  8.0 (2019) & Tab A Kids (2019) 
In October 2019, the 2019 version of the Galaxy Tab A  8.0 and Tab A Kids was announced, with Android 9 Pie and the Qualcomm Snapdragon 429 chipset, and made available on 5 October
2019. It is the same as the original, but in Wi-Fi only. The kids version is essentially the same tablet but with a bumper case for protection.

See also
Comparison of tablet computers
Samsung Galaxy Tab series
Samsung Galaxy Tab A 9.7

References

Samsung Galaxy Tab series
Android (operating system) devices
Tablet computers introduced in 2015
Tablet computers